USS Sparrow II (SP-3231) was a United States Navy patrol vessel in commission from 1918 to 1919.

Sparrow II was built as a civilian motorboat of the same name in 1915 by the Charles Rhode & Sons Company at Baltimore, Maryland. In mid-September 1918, the U.S. Navy acquired her from her owner, the Sparrows Point Steel Company of Baltimore, for use as a section patrol boat during World War I. She was commissioned as USS Sparrow II (SP-3231) on 25 September 1918.

Assigned to the 5th Naval District, Sparrow II patrolled the coasts of Maryland and Virginia for the rest of World War I and into 1919.

Sparrow II was sold to J. G. Samp of Baltimore on 30 June 1919.

References
 
 SP-3231 Sparrow II at Department of the Navy Naval History and Heritage Command Online Library of Selected Images: U.S. Navy Ships: -- Listed by Hull Number: "SP" #s and "ID" #s -- World War I Era Patrol Vessels and other Acquired Ships and Craft numbered from SP-3200 through SP-3299
 NavSource Online: Section Patrol Craft Photo Archive Sparrow II (SP 3231)

Patrol vessels of the United States Navy
World War I patrol vessels of the United States
Ships built in Baltimore
1915 ships